Thomas Prosser may refer to:

 Thomas Prosser, slaveholder of Gabriel Prosser of Gabriel's Rebellion
 Thomas Prosser (architect) (1817–1888), company architect of the North Eastern Railway Company
 Thomas Prosser (ski jumper), West German ski jumper